C. K. Viswanathan (22 November 1922 - 24 February 2002) was an Indian politician and a leader of the Communist Party of India. He was a member of the Travancore–Cochin Legislative Assembly, representing the Vaikom constituency in 1952 and 1954. He is the father of Rajya Sabha member Binoy Viswam.

References

1922 births
2002 deaths
Communist Party of India politicians from Kerala
Travancore–Cochin MLAs 1952–1954
Travancore–Cochin MLAs 1954–1956
People from Vaikom